Rodrigo Dourado Cunha (born 17 June 1994) is a Brazilian professional footballer who plays as a midfielder for Liga MX club Atlético San Luis.

Club career
Rodrigo made his debut with Internacional on 26 January 2012 in a Campeonato Gaúcho match against Cerâmica. He came on as a 78th-minute substitute for Guilherme Afonso Noe as Internacional lost 1–2. He then made his professional debut in the Brasileiro on 16 September 2012 against Recife. He started and played one half as Internacional drew the match 2–2.

Rodrigo made his international club debut in the Copa Libertadores on 16 April 2015 against Universidad de Chile. He started the match and played the whole 90 minutes as Internacional won 4–0.

International career

Brazilian Olympic Team
On 29 June 2016, Dourado was called up, by coach Rogério Micale, for playing Olympic Games.

Career statistics

Club

Honours 
Brazil
Olympic Gold Medal: 2016

Individual
Bola de Prata: 2018
Campeonato Brasileiro Série A Team of the Year: 2018

References

External links
Internacional Profile.

1994 births
Living people
People from Pelotas
Brazilian footballers
Brazil youth international footballers
Sport Club Internacional players
Association football midfielders
Campeonato Brasileiro Série A players
Campeonato Brasileiro Série B players
Olympic footballers of Brazil
Footballers at the 2016 Summer Olympics
Olympic gold medalists for Brazil
Olympic medalists in football
Medalists at the 2016 Summer Olympics
Sportspeople from Rio Grande do Sul